Outback Nunataks is a series of bare rock nunataks and mountains which are distributed over an area about  long by  wide. The group lies south of Emlen Peaks of the Usarp Mountains and west of Monument Nunataks and upper Rennick Glacier, adjacent to the featureless interior plateau. They were discovered by the U.S. Victoria Land Traverse party, 1959–60, and mapped by United States Geological Survey (USGS) from surveys and U.S. Navy air photos, 1959–64. They were so named by Advisory Committee on Antarctic Names (US-ACAN) for their remote position at the posterior side of the large mountain belt that extends from the Ross Sea to the interior ice plateau.

Features
Geographic features of the Outback Nunataks include:

 Chan Rocks
 Coleman Bluffs
 De Camp Nunatak
 Derbyshire Peak
 Doe Nunatak
 Doescher Nunatak
 Fitzsimmons Nunataks
 Frontier Mountain
 Johannessen Nunataks
 Miller Butte
 Mount Blair
 Mount Bower
 Mount Chadwick
 Mount Joern
 Mount Koons
 Mount Southard
 Mount Spatz
 Mount Walton
 Mount Weihaupt
 Nims Peak
 Oona Cliff
 Roberts Butte
 Saunders Bluff
 The Office Girls
 Welcome Mountain
 Womochel Peaks
 Wu Nunatak

Nunataks of Victoria Land
Pennell Coast